Inhambane may refer to:

 Inhambane, city located in southern Mozambique
 Inhambane Province, province of Mozambique located on the coast in the southern part of the country
 Inhambane Airport, airport in Jangamo District, Inhambane Province, Mozambique